Young America is a 1942 American drama film directed by Louis King and written by Samuel G. Engel. The film stars Jane Withers, Jane Darwell, Lynne Roberts, Robert Cornell, William Tracy and Roman Bohnen. The film was released on February 6, 1942, by 20th Century Fox.

Plot

Cast   
Jane Withers as Jane Campbell
Jane Darwell as Grandmother Nora Campbell
Lynne Roberts as Elizabeth Barnes
Robert Cornell as Jonathan Blake
William Tracy as Earl Tucker
Roman Bohnen as Mr. Barnes
Irving Bacon as Bart Munson
Ben Carter as Abraham
Louise Beavers as Pansy
Darryl Hickman as David Engstrom
Sally Harper as Susie Clark
Carmencita Johnson as Hazel
Daphne Ogden as Ellen
Charles Arnt as Principal Rice
Hamilton MacFadden as Jim Benson

References

External links 
 

1942 films
1940s English-language films
20th Century Fox films
American drama films
1942 drama films
Films directed by Louis King
American black-and-white films
1940s American films